Ira Coray Abbott was named captain of the 1st Michigan Infantry Regiment on  May 1, 1861. He left the active service voluntarily on August 7, 1861, but re-entered on September 12, 1861. He was promoted to Major on April 28, 1862, and to Lieutenant Colonel on August 30, 1862. Abbott commanded the regiment at the Battle of Fredericksburg in December 1862 where he was wounded. He was promoted to colonel on March 18, 1863. At the Battle of Gettysburg the regiment was attached to the brigade of Colonel William S. Tilton; which faced the Confederate attack in the area of Stony Sill on July 2, 1863. On March 13, 1865, Abbott received a brevet promotion to brigadier general for "bravery and meritorious service during the war."

References

External links 
For the translation from French to English on the article of Ira Coray Abbott.
 :fr:Ira Coray Abbott

1824 births
1908 deaths
Union Army colonels
Burials at Arlington National Cemetery
People from Allegany County, New York